Paul Davies (born October 1955) is professor of the history of art at the University of Reading. Davies is a specialist in the architecture of Italy 1350–1650, centrally planned churches and the architectural response to miracles, architecture in Venice and the Veneto, and Italian Renaissance architectural drawings.

Selected publications
Michele Sanmicheli. Electa, 2004. (with David Hemsoll)
The Paper Museum of Cassiano Dal Pozzo. A.X. Renaissance and later architecture and ornament. Royal Collection, 2013.
Architecture and Pilgrimage 1000-1500: the Southern Mediterranean and Beyond. Ashgate, 2013. (editor with D. Howard and W. Pullan)

References 

Academics of the University of Reading
British art historians
Living people
1955 births